The 
Macaé de Cima Environmental Protection Area is a state-level environmental protection area in the state of Rio de Janeiro, Brazil. It protects an area of Atlantic Forest in the Serra do Mar mountains.

Location

The APA adjoins the municipalities of Macaé, Trajano de Morais, Bom Jardim, Cachoeiras de Macacu and Silva Jardim.
It lies completely within the basin of the Macaé River.
The RJ-142 highway between the cities of Nova Friburgo and Casimiro de Abreu runs through the APA beside the Macaé River.

The APA overlaps with the Rio Bonito and Macaé de Cima municipal environmental protection areas and the Três Picos State Park.
It is in the Central Rio de Janeiro Atlantic Forest Mosaic, created in 2006.

History

The Macaé de Cima Environmental Protection Area was created by state decree 29.213 of 14 September 2001.
It was created to protect a remnant of the dense rainforest that once covered the entire Serra do Mar, which is home to rare, endangered or endemic native species, and to protect the headwaters of the Macaé de Cima, Bonito, Das Flores and Santo Antônio rivers.

Environment

September is the driest month and December is the wettest.
Vegetation is montane or submontane rainforest.
Fauna found in the APA include the white-bearded antshrike (Biatas nigropectus), sloth, cougar (Puma concolor), ocelot (Leopardus pardalis), southern tamandua (Tamandua tetradactyla), buffy-tufted marmoset (Callithrix aurita), hawk, falcon, toucan, howler monkey, capybara, paca, armadillo, common agouti, jaguarundi and deer.

Human activities

There are several places of natural beauty that the public uses for leisure and recreation, but generally they are in private areas.
A considerable amount of research is conducted in the APA, particularly by the Rio de Janeiro Botanical Garden and Fluminense Federal University.
The APA is suitable for tourism in contact with nature, bathing in the rivers and waterfalls, birdwatching and extreme outdoor sports such as kayaking, rafting, trekking, mountain biking, rappelling and tree climbing.
Threats include real estate speculation, sewage, hunting, deforestation to expand pasturage, growth of banana cultivation and lack of communication.

Notes

Sources

Environmental protection areas of Brazil
Protected areas of Rio de Janeiro (state)
2001 establishments in Brazil